Boubakary Diarra (born 30 August 1993) is a French-born football player who has played for a number of European clubs and represented Mali at youth level.

Club career
He made his professional debut in the Segunda Liga for Sporting Covilhã on 8 August 2016 in a game against Desportivo das Aves.

On 28 June 2018, he signed a two-year contract with Portuguese Primeira Liga side Tondela.

However, just two months later, and without playing any games for Tondela, he signed a two-year contract with Italian Serie C club Rieti on 28 August 2018. On 18 January 2019 he was released from his Rieti contract by mutual consent.

On 1 February 2019, he joined Portuguese second-tier club Cova Piedade.

On 22 June 2022, Diarra joined Saudi Arabian club Hajer. On 22 August 2022, Diarra's contract with the club was canceled despite making no appearances.

International
He represented Mali at the 2013 African U-20 Championship.

Personal
He is a cousin of Lassana Diarra.

References

External links

1993 births
People from Villepinte, Seine-Saint-Denis
French sportspeople of Malian descent
Living people
Citizens of Mali through descent
Association football midfielders
Malian footballers
French footballers
Malian expatriate footballers
Expatriate footballers in Italy
A.C. Bra players
Expatriate footballers in Lithuania
A Lyga players
S.C. Covilhã players
Expatriate footballers in Portugal
C.D. Tondela players
F.C. Rieti players
C.D. Cova da Piedade players
Kazma SC players
Hajer FC players
Liga Portugal 2 players
Serie C players
Kuwait Premier League players
French expatriate footballers
Malian expatriate sportspeople in Italy
Malian expatriate sportspeople in Lithuania
Malian expatriate sportspeople in Portugal
Malian expatriate sportspeople in Kuwait
Malian expatriate sportspeople in Saudi Arabia
French expatriate sportspeople in Italy
French expatriate sportspeople in Lithuania
French expatriate sportspeople in Portugal
French expatriate sportspeople in Saudi Arabia
French expatriate sportspeople in Kuwait
Expatriate footballers in Kuwait
Expatriate footballers in Saudi Arabia
Footballers from Seine-Saint-Denis